Chagrin Falls High School is a public high school located in Chagrin Falls, Ohio, United States, an eastern suburb in the Greater Cleveland metropolitan area. The high school's mascot is Mortimer the Tiger.

History
Chagrin Falls High School issued its first diploma in 1879, with only one graduate, Hugh Christian.  The first group to graduate was in 1888, a class of four people. As of 2011, the high school has graduated over 10,000 students.

Awards and recognition
During the 2004-05 school year, Chagrin Falls High School was recognized with the Blue Ribbon School Award of Excellence by the United States Department of Education, the highest award an American school can receive.

In 2008, it was placed 135th on Newsweek magazine's Top 1,300 Schools list (2nd in Greater Cleveland, behind neighboring high school Solon, and 5th in Ohio). In 2011, it climbed to 92nd in the year ratings.

Athletics
The school is a member of the Chagrin Valley Conference (CVC), Chagrin Division as part of the Ohio High School Athletic Association (OHSAA) for interscholastic sports.

State championships
 Boys Cross Country - 1971
 Girls Cross Country - 1991
 Girls Soccer - 1996, 2021 
 Girls Basketball - 1998
 Boys Lacrosse - 2003 2015, 2019

Individual State Champions
 Girls Track and field -  2019 4x800 (Hannah Hoimes, Hannah Bargar, Hannah Brosnan, Hannah Lowe)

Notable alumni
Tim Conway, actor
Casey Cott, actor
Corey Cott, actor
Bob Dahl, NFL football player for the Cleveland Browns and Cincinnati Bengals
Sean McHugh, NFL football player for the Pittsburgh Steelers
Diana Munz, Olympic gold and silver medalist in swimming
Brian Robiskie, NFL football player for the Cleveland Browns, Detroit Lions and Atlanta Falcons
Harry Smith, professional ten-pin bowler and member of the PBA and USBC Halls of Fame
Lee Unkrich, co-director of Pixar feature films Toy Story 2, Monsters, Inc., and Finding Nemo
Fred Van Lente, comic book writer
Bill Watterson, creator of Calvin and Hobbes comics*

Notes and references

External links
 Official website
 Chagrin Falls High School athletics

High schools in Cuyahoga County, Ohio
Public high schools in Ohio